Jessika Jayne Nash (born 5 October 2004) is an Australian soccer player who plays for Melbourne Victory in the A-League Women. She has previously played for Canberra United and Sydney FC.

Early life
Nash grew up in New South Wales and played for FNSW Institute. Nash started playing football at the age of four. Nash's family was supportive of her career choice from a young age. Three generations of her family travelled to watch her play at the 2019 AFC U-16 Women's Championship. Nash's father, Don, was a cricketer for NSW Blues.

Club career

Canberra United
On 20 October 2020, Nash signed for Canberra United for the 2020–21 W-League season, together with Clare Hunt. On 30 December 2020, Nash made her W-League debut against Adelaide United in a 4–3 victory for Canberra. Nash started the match playing the full 90 minutes, with Adelaide taking a 2–0 lead during the match, only for Canberra United to strike back courtesy of a Michelle Heyman hat trick and a Laura Hughes stoppage time winner. Heyman praised Nash for her performance. After helping Canberra United qualify for the finals series with an unbeaten streak in March, Nash was nominated for the Young Footballer of the Year Award.

Sydney FC
In September 2021, Nash joined Sydney FC ahead of the 2021–22 A-League Women season, together with Sarah Hunter, looking to progress her career.

Melbourne Victory
In September 2022, Nash joined Melbourne Victory ahead of the 2022–23 A-League Women season.

International career
Although the youngest member of the squad, Nash was selected as captain of the Junior Matildas, resulting in Nash being a pivotal part of the team during both 2019 AFC U-16 Women's Championship qualification and final tournament. Nash made her Junior Matildas debut on 17 September 2018, playing 90 minutes in an 11–0 victory against Palestine. She featured during six matches of qualification and she started all five games in the final tournament, playing 424 minutes.

References 

2004 births
Australian women's soccer players
Living people
Canberra United FC players
Sydney FC (A-League Women) players
Melbourne Victory FC (A-League Women) players
Sportswomen from New South Wales
Soccer players from New South Wales
A-League Women players
Women's association footballers not categorized by position
Australia women's international soccer players